Adolf Proost was a Belgian lieutenant general.
 He played a part in the Battle of the Silver Helmets which was a battle between German and Belgian mounted army units at the start of World War I on 12 August 1914 near Halen.

Battle of Halen
The confrontation has been called the last great cavalry charge with the white saber in Western Europe.
 In addition to horsemen, the Germans also had twelve Maxim machine guns at their disposal, while the Belgian army had to make do with two Hotchkiss machine guns. Proost was commander of the 2nd Cavalry Brigade and, contrary to General De Witte's orders, decided not to deploy his lancers on the designated obscure area between the woods at Loksbergen and Halen. He chose because of the better view of the approaching Germans for another, more strategic location, at the Iron Mining farm, which became the central point of defense during the battle. The battle was a temporary success for the Belgian army, although 160 Belgians were killed against 140 Germans.

References

1853 births
1921 deaths
Belgian military personnel of World War I
Belgian Army generals of World War I
People from Heist-op-den-Berg